Edward Ernest Sauter (December 2, 1914 – April 21, 1981) was a composer and arranger during the swing era.

Biography
Sauter studied music at Columbia University and the Juilliard School. He began as a drummer and then played trumpet professionally, including with Red Norvo's orchestra. Eventually he became a full-time arranger for Norvo. He arranged and composed for Artie Shaw, Tommy Dorsey, Woody Herman, and especially Benny Goodman, earning a reputation for intricate work such as "Benny Rides Again," "Moonlight on the Ganges," and "Clarinet a la King". A bout of tuberculosis contracted in 1942, however, forced a stay at Pomona, NY's Summit Park Sanatorium and stalled his musical career for some time. 

From 1952 to 1958, Sauter was co-leader of the Sauter-Finegan Orchestra. Between 1957 and 1959, he was Kurt Edelhagen's successor as leader of the SWF orchestra in Baden-Baden, Germany. In 1961, he worked with tenor saxophonist Stan Getz on Focus, a collaboration for which Sauter at Getz's commission wrote a suite of string compositions without primary melodies. This allowed Getz to improvise them in his customary style. Roy Haynes, the jazz drummer, appeared on "I'm Late, I'm Late", the only selection to use a non-string instrument other than Getz.

Sauter and Getz collaborated again during Sauter's work composing the score for the film Mickey One (1965), which starred Warren Beatty. His television composing includes the third season theme to Rod Serling's Night Gallery. In 2003 he was inducted into the Big Band and Jazz Hall of Fame.

Although Sauter is best known for jazz, he also orchestrated Broadway musicals such as 1776, The Apple Tree, and It's a Bird...It's a Plane...It's Superman. Orchestrator Jonathan Tunick said of Sauter's Broadway work, "Eddie did these marvelous things, always theatrical, always effective. And completely unlike anybody else." His composition "World Without Time" is used as the theme music for the public affairs show The Open Mind, originally hosted by Richard Heffner.

Death
Sauter died of a heart attack in Nyack, New York, on April 21, 1981.

Selected discography

As arranger and composer
 Ray McKinley, Borderline (1955)
 Mildred Bailey, Me and the Blues (1957)
 Stan Getz, Focus (Verve, 1961)
 Stan Getz, Stan Getz Plays Music from the Soundtrack of Mickey One (Verve, 1965)
 Benny Goodman, Benny Goodman Plays Eddie Sauter (Hep, 1997)
 Red Norvo, Knockin' on Wood (ASV Living Era, 1999)
 Sauter-Finegan Orchestra, Inside the Sound (1952)
 Sauter-Finegan Orchestra, NBC Bandstand Live: 1957 (Collectors' Choice, 1997)
 John Carisi, Eddie Sauter, Christian Wolff, Stefan Wolpe, Counterpoise (hatART, 2000)

References

External links
[ All Music]

Jazz a la Sauter: Eddie Sauter

1914 births
1981 deaths
American jazz composers
American male jazz composers
American music arrangers
American television composers
American jazz bandleaders
Musicians from Brooklyn
Jazz arrangers
20th-century jazz composers
20th-century American composers
Jazz musicians from New York (state)
20th-century American male musicians
Columbia College (New York) alumni